The Palestine white papers are the British government statements of policy presented to Parliament regarding Mandatory Palestine, issued between 1922 and 1946.

White Papers

Other command papers
 Cmd 1499: An Interim Report on the Civil Administration of Palestine During the Period Ist July, 1920-30 June 1921. London:HMSO, 1921.
 Cmd 1540: Palestine Disturbances of May, 1921: Reports of the Commissioners of Inquiry . . . (Haycraft) London: HMSO, 1921.
 Cmd 1785: Mandate for Palestine. London: HMSO, July 1922.
 Cmd 1889: Papers relating to the elections for the Palestine Legislative Council. London: HMSO, 1923.
 Cmd 3530: Report of the Commission (Palestine Disturbances of August 1929; Shaw). London: HMSO, 1930.
 Cmd 3683-3687: Report on Immigration, Land Settlement and Development by Sir John Hope Simpson London: HMSO, 1930.
 Cmd 5479: Report of the Palestine Royal Commission . . . (Peel) London: HMSO, 1937.
 Cmd 5854: Report of the Palestine Partition Commission (Woodhead) London: HMSO, 1938.

See also
 White paper (disambiguation)

References

Documents of Mandatory Palestine